In computing, the SSH File Transfer Protocol (also known as Secure File Transfer Protocol or SFTP) is a network protocol that provides file access, file transfer, and file management over any reliable data stream. It was designed by the Internet Engineering Task Force (IETF) as an extension of the Secure Shell protocol (SSH) version 2.0 to provide secure file transfer capabilities. The IETF Internet Draft states that, even though this protocol is described in the context of the SSH-2 protocol, it could be used in a number of different applications, such as secure file transfer over Transport Layer Security (TLS) and transfer of management information in VPN applications.

This protocol assumes that it is run over a secure channel, such as SSH, that the server has already authenticated the client, and that the identity of the client user is available to the protocol.

Capabilities
Compared to the SCP protocol, which only allows file transfers, the SFTP protocol allows for a range of operations on remote files which make it more like a remote file system protocol. An SFTP client's extra capabilities include resuming interrupted transfers, directory listings, and remote file removal.

SFTP attempts to be more platform-independent than SCP; with SCP, for instance, the expansion of wildcards specified by the client is up to the server, whereas SFTP's design avoids this problem. While SCP is most frequently implemented on Unix platforms, SFTP servers are commonly available on most platforms. The file transfer is fast in SCP when compared to the SFTP protocol due to the back and forth nature of the SFTP protocol. In SFTP, the file transfer can be easily terminated without terminating a session like other mechanisms do.

SFTP is not FTP run over SSH, but rather a new protocol designed from the ground up by the IETF SECSH working group. It is sometimes confused with Simple File Transfer Protocol.

The protocol itself does not provide authentication and security; it expects the underlying protocol to secure this. SFTP is most often used as subsystem of SSH protocol version 2 implementations, having been designed by the same working group. It is possible, however, to run it over SSH-1 (and some implementations support this) or other data streams. Running an SFTP server over SSH-1 is not platform-independent as SSH-1 does not support the concept of subsystems. An SFTP client willing to connect to an SSH-1 server needs to know the path to the SFTP server binary on the server side.

Uploaded files may be associated with their basic attributes, such as time stamps. This is an advantage over the common FTP protocol.

History and development
The Internet Engineering Task Force (IETF) working group "Secsh" that was responsible for the development of the Secure Shell version 2 protocol (RFC 4251) also attempted to draft an extension of that standard for secure file transfer functionality.  Internet Drafts were created that successively revised the protocol into new versions.  The software industry began to implement various versions of the protocol before the drafts were standardized.  As development work progressed, the scope of the Secsh File Transfer project expanded to include file access and file management.  Eventually, development stalled as some committee members began to view SFTP as a file system protocol, not just a file access or file transfer protocol, which places it beyond the purview of the working group. After a seven-year hiatus, in 2013 an attempt was made to restart work on SFTP using the version 3 draft as the baseline.

Versions 0–2
Prior to the IETF's involvement, SFTP was a proprietary protocol of SSH Communications Security, designed by Tatu Ylönen with assistance from Sami Lehtinen in 1997. Differences between versions 0–2 and version 3 are enumerated upon in section 10 of draft-ietf-secsh-filexfer-02.

Version 3
At the outset of the IETF Secure Shell File Transfer project, the Secsh group stated that its objective of SSH File Transfer Protocol was to provide a secure file transfer functionality over any reliable data stream, and to be the standard file transfer protocol for use with the SSH-2 protocol.

Drafts 00–02 of the IETF Internet Draft define successive revisions of version 3 of the SFTP protocol.
 SSH File Transfer Protocol, Draft 00, January 2001
 SSH File Transfer Protocol, Draft 01, March 2001
 SSH File Transfer Protocol, Draft 02, October 2001

Version 4
Drafts 03–04 of the IETF Internet Draft define version 4 of the protocol.
 SSH File Transfer Protocol, Draft 03, October 2002
 SSH File Transfer Protocol, Draft 04, December 2002

Version 5
Draft 05 of the IETF Internet Draft defines version 5 of the protocol.
 SSH File Transfer Protocol, Draft 05, January 2004

Version 6
Drafts 06–13 of the IETF Internet Draft define successive revisions of version 6 of the protocol.
 SSH File Transfer Protocol, Draft 06, October 2004
 SSH File Transfer Protocol, Draft 07, March 2005
 SSH File Transfer Protocol, Draft 08, April 2005
 SSH File Transfer Protocol, Draft 09, June 2005
 SSH File Transfer Protocol, Draft 10, June 2005
 SSH File Transfer Protocol, Draft 11, January 2006
 SSH File Transfer Protocol, Draft 12, January 2006
 SSH File Transfer Protocol, Draft 13, July 2006

Software

SFTP client

The term SFTP can also refer to Secure file transfer program, a command-line program that implements the client part of this protocol.  As an example, the sftp program supplied with OpenSSH implements this.

Some implementations of the scp program support both the SFTP and SCP protocols to perform file transfers, depending on what the server supports.

SFTP server
Some FTP server implementations implement the SFTP protocol; however, outside of dedicated file servers, SFTP protocol support is usually provided by an SSH server implementation, as it shares the default port of 22 with other SSH services.  SFTP implementations may include an SSH protocol implementation to leverage integration of SSH connection details with preexisting FTP server access controls, where an alternative SSH server is tolerable or where alternative ports may be used. An SSH-2 server which supports subsystems may be leveraged to keep a uniform SSH implementation while enhancing access controls with third party software, at the cost of fine-grained integration with connection details, and SSH-1 compatibility.

SFTP proxy
It is difficult to control SFTP transfers on security devices at the network perimeter. There are standard tools for logging FTP transactions, like TIS gdev or SUSE FTP proxy, but SFTP is encrypted, rendering traditional proxies ineffective for controlling SFTP traffic.

There are some tools that implement man-in-the-middle for SSH which also feature SFTP control. Examples of such a tool are Shell Control Box from Balabit and CryptoAuditor from SSH Communications Security (the original developer of the Secure Shell protocol) which provides functions such as SFTP transaction logging and logging of the actual data transmitted on the wire.

See also
 Comparison of SSH clients
 Comparison of SSH servers
 Comparison of file transfer protocols
 FISH
 FTPS
 Lsh—a GNU SSH-2 and SFTP server for Unix-like OSes
 SSHFS—Mounting remote filesystem using SFTP and SSH
 :Category:FTP clients
 :Category:SSH File Transfer Protocol clients

References

Cryptographic protocols
Network file transfer protocols
Secure Shell